Patrick Galvin  (30 March 1911 – 24 September 1980) was an Australian politician.

Biography
Born in Quorn, South Australia, he was educated at Rostrevor College. Galvin was an engineer by profession, but became involved in the trade union movement, rising to become South Australian state organiser of the Australian Society of Engineers in June 1947. In January 1948, he became state industrial officer of the Australian Workers' Union, in which capacity he was credited with resisting an attempt by the communist-dominated Miners' Federation to recruit AWU members at the Leigh Creek mine. Galvin was secretary and president of the Australian Labor Party's Glenelg electorate committee and was an AWU delegate to the party's state council.

In 1951, he was elected to the Australian House of Representatives as a member of the Labor Party, defeating Liberal MP Jim Handby for the seat of Kingston. He held the seat until 1966, when he was defeated by Liberal candidate Kay Brownbill. Galvin died in 1980.

References

Australian Labor Party members of the Parliament of Australia
Members of the Australian House of Representatives for Kingston
Members of the Australian House of Representatives
Australian Officers of the Order of the British Empire
1911 births
1980 deaths
People educated at Rostrevor College
20th-century Australian politicians